Cordwainer is a small, almost rectangular-shaped ward in the City of London. It is named after the cordwainers, the professional shoemakers who historically lived and worked in this particular area of London; there is a Livery Company for the trade — the Worshipful Company of Cordwainers. The ward is sometimes referred to as the "Cordwainers' ward".

It is bounded to the north by Poultry and Cheapside (the boundary with Cheap ward); to the west by the eponymous Bread Street and the ward of the same name; to the south by Cannon Street (and Vintry and Dowgate wards); and to the east by Walbrook ward and a street of the same name.

Streets within Cordwainer's boundaries are, amongst others, Bow Lane, Pancras Lane and part of Watling Street. Queen Street runs north–south through the centre of the ward.

Former precincts
In mediaeval times and long before the most recent boundary changes in 2003, Cordwainer was divided into eight precincts:
St. Mary, Aldermary, upper and lower
Allhallows, Bread Street
St. Mary-le-Bow
St. Antholin, upper and lower
St. Pancras
St. Bennet, Sherehog and St. John
St. Thomas the Apostle
Trinity

21st century

The contemporary ward is home to many large businesses and new initiatives such as Bow Bells House, named after the bells of St Mary-le-Bow church—and not, as sometimes thought, after the area of Bow. Cordwainer contains one other church, St Mary Aldermary, and the site of St Antholin, Budge Row, demolished in 1875.
Cordwainer ward is quite distinctive for its high number of licensed premises.

Ward of Cordwainer Club
The Ward of Cordwainer Club was founded in 1902 and has 260 members. The clubs role is
 the encouragement of  interest in the affairs of the City of London,
 the generation a friendly spirit
 the improvement the quality of life mainly within the Ward.
It further aims to lend support to the municipal officials of the ward.

Politics
Cordwainer is one of 25 ancient wards of the City of London, each electing an alderman to the Court of Aldermen and  commoners (the City equivalent of a councillor) elected to the Court of Common Council of the City of London Corporation. Only electors who are Freemen of the City are eligible to stand for election. The current Alderman is Roger Gifford and the current Common Councilmen are: Mark Boleat, Michael Snyder and Alex Barr.

References

External links
Cordwainer The Official Ward Website

Wards of the City of London